The Rovinari Power Station is one of the largest electricity producers in Romania, having 4 groups of 330 MW each thus totaling an installed capacity of 1,320 MW.

The power plant is undergoing modernization works, which will add a new 500 MW group at a total cost of US$600 million. After the modernization, the power plant will have a total installed capacity of 1,820MW. Other important works include the fitting of several sulfur filters at the existing power groups at a total cost of US$250 million.

The power plant is situated in the Gorj County (Southwestern Romania) on the banks of the Jiu River near Târgu Jiu.

See also

 List of power stations in Romania

References

External links
 Official webpage of Rovinari Power Station

Coal-fired power stations in Romania